Ferzan Özpetek (born 3 February 1959) is a Turkish-Italian film director and screenwriter, residing in Italy.

Biography
Ferzan Özpetek was born in Istanbul in 1959. In 1976, he decided to move to Italy to study Cinema History at Sapienza University of Rome. He completed his education attending art history and costume design classes at the Navona Academy. He also attended director classes at the Silvio D'Amico National Academy of Dramatic Art.

After receiving stage experience with Julian Beck's Living Theatre, he moved to the cinema landscape, by working as a director assistant to Massimo Troisi, Maurizio Ponzi, Ricky Tognazzi, Sergio Citti and Francesco Nuti. His first work was as Troisi's assistant director for Scusate il ritardo, followed by Ponzi's Sono contento, where he had a small role performing as a “madonnaro".
 
His directorial debut was with Hamam, an Italian, Spanish and Turkish co-production. The movie, released in May 1997, was presented at the 50th edition of the Cannes Film Festival in the Quinzaine des Realisateurs session. The movie was presented in other international festivals and was sold for distribution in more than 20 countries around the world.
 
In 1999, he directed Harem Suare, set in his native land of Turkey, telling the tormented love story between the sultan's favourite, Safiye, and the eunuch Nadir, with the fall of the Ottoman Empire in the background. The story was written by Özpetek himself in collaboration with Gianni Romoli, who also produced the movie with Tilde Corsi and their R&C Production company. The film was presented in the Un Certain Regard section at the Cannes Film Festival, as well as at the London Film Festival and at the Toronto International Film Festival.

In 2001, Özpetek directed The Ignorant Fairies (Le fate ignoranti), starring Margherita Buy and Stefano Accorsi, a sweet and easy to watch drama about homosexuality and bonding and friendship of several kinds of outsiders. The movie won numerous awards including three Globo d'oro and four Nastro d'Argento awards.

Facing Windows (La finestra di fronte) was released in 2003. It starred Giovanna Mezzogiorno, Raoul Bova, Filippo Nigro and Massimo Girotti, in what turned out to be his last performance on film. The film won multiple awards including: five David di Donatello, four Ciak d’Oro and three Globo d'oro awards. The film's success in Italy and the rest of Europe, led it to be distributed by Sony Pictures Classics in North America.

Once again pairing up with producers Gianni Romoli and Tilde Corsi, in 2005, Özpetek directed Cuore Sacro, which received 12 nominations at the David di Donatello awards, where Barbora Bobuľová won the Best Actress award. The film also won the award for production design.

His next film, Saturn in Opposition, was released in 2007. It featured a very rich cast: Pierfrancesco Favino, Luca Argentero, Isabella Ferrari and Ambra Angiolini, and also Margherita Buy and Stefano Accorsi with whom he worked with earlier, in Le fate ignoranti. The movie won four Ciak d’oro, five Globo d'oro and four Nastro d'Argento awards. Angiolini, in her acting debut, won the David di Donatello award for the Best Actress in a Supporting Role.

That same year, Özpetek served on the jury at the 64th Venice International Film Festival. He also directed commercial ads, including a spot for the AIRL (the Italian association for cancer research) that featured Isabella Ferrari.
 
In 2008, Özpetek ended his partnership with producers Romoli and Corsi, and started a new one with Domenico Procacci and his Fandango company. Also, for the first time, he began work on a movie that was not based on his own original story idea. The film was based on a novel written by Melania Gaia Mazzucco called Un giorno perfetto. The film of the same name starred Isabella Ferrari and Valerio Mastandrea and was presented at the 65th Venice International Film Festival. It grossed 3 million euro at the box-office.

In 2008, the Museum of Modern Art in New York City, dedicated a retrospective on him, screening all of his movies. He has been one of the few Italian directors to be given this honour.

In April 2009, he directed a short movie called Nonostante tutto è Pasqua (Despite Everything it's Easter), a segment of the project L’Aquila 2009 - Cinque registi tra le macerie, in which multiple directors took on subjects regarding the 2009 L'Aquila earthquake. Özpetek's short was dedicated to Alessandra Cora, an aspiring singer who died in her house's rubble.

His next film Loose Cannons was released in 2010. It was co-written with Ivan Cotroneo and stars Riccardo Scamarcio, Alessandro Preziosi, Nicole Grimaudo and Ennio Fantastichini. It is a comedy concerning the family issues of a household in Lecce. This is one of the few movies Özpetek has set outside Rome, a city very close to his heart. On 22 May 2010 the city of Lecce declared Özpetek honorary citizen.

The movie was presented out of competition at the 70th edition of the Berlinale as well as at the Tribeca Film Festival 2010, getting a special recognition of the jury.

In 2011, he was asked to direct Giuseppe Verdi's "La traviata" at San Carlo Opera House, and performed in December 2012, starring Carmen Giannattasio and Saimir Pirgu. It filmed for TV by Unitel Classica, and Pal DVD release in Italian company CG Entertainment (2015).

Filmography

Producer
Cebimdeki Yabancı (2018)

Assistant director
Il tenente dei carabinieri (1986)
Il maestro del terrore (The Prince of Terror- 1988, TV)
La Scorta (The Bodyguards, 1993)
 Anche i commercialisti hanno un'anima (1994)
 Il Branco (1994)

Novels
 Rosso Istanbul (2013) - Mondadori - 
 Sei la mia vita (2015) - Mondadori -

Awards

Only awards won for best direction or best film are included.

 Facing Windows:
 David di Donatello Award
 Best film
 Scholars Jury Award
 Best Direction
 Italian National Syndicate of Film Journalists
 Best Original Story (together with Gianni Romoli)
 Karlovy Vary International Film Festival
 Best Direction
 Crystal Globe for Ferzan Özpetek
 Bangkok International Film Festival
 Best Film
 Foyle Film Festival
 Best Feature
 Rehoboth Beach Independent Film Festival, Audience Award
 Best Feature
 Seattle International Film Festival
 Best film

 Hamam (Il bagno turco)
 Golden Orange (Antalya International Film Festival)
 Best film
 Best direction
 Italian National Syndicate of Film Journalists Silver Ribbon award
 Best Producer
 The Ignorant Fairies (Le fate ignoranti)
 Austin Gay & Lesbian International Film Festival
 Best Feature
 New York Lesbian and Gay Film Festival
 Best Feature

 2008. Italian Medal of Merit.

References

Other sources
 Biyografi.net - Biography of Ferzan Özpetek
 Biyografi.info - Biographies : Ferzan Özpetek

External links
 
 

1959 births
Best Director Golden Orange Award winners
David di Donatello winners
Italian film directors
Italian male screenwriters
Turkish emigrants to Italy
Italian LGBT screenwriters
Turkish LGBT screenwriters
LGBT film directors
Italian gay writers
Turkish gay writers
Living people
Film people from Istanbul
Turkish film directors
Turkish male screenwriters
Accademia Nazionale di Arte Drammatica Silvio D'Amico alumni
Gay screenwriters